Graham Molloy (born 26 June 1947) is a former Australian rules footballer who played for Melbourne in the VFL during the 1970s.

Molloy played most of his football on the ball but was also used at half forward. A left footer, he started his career in the SANFL with Norwood and starred for South Australia in the 1969 Adelaide Carnival, winning the Tassie Medal and earning All Australian selection. In 1970 he joined Melbourne in the VFL and remained there until 1975, playing a total of 67 games.

External links 
 
 

1947 births
Australian rules footballers from South Australia
Living people
Melbourne Football Club players
Norwood Football Club players
All-Australians (1953–1988)